Fereshteh Hosseini (born April 26, 1997) is an afghan actress. She is known for her acting in Parting (2016), Rona, Azim's Mother (2018) and The Frog (2020–2021). She won the Best Actress award at the 16th Marrakech International Film Festival for her performance in Parting.

Early life 
Fereshteh Hosseini was born on April 26, 1980 in Tehran, Iran. She is an Iranian actress of Afghan descent. Her parents were two Afghans who immigrated to Iran before her birth due to the war in Afghanistan. She has four sisters named Masoumeh, Maryam, Hani and Zahra and a brother named Mohammad. Her sister Maryam is also an actress.

Personal life 

In 2020, rumors began circulating about a relationship between Hosseini and Navid Mohammadzadeh. In April 2021, Mohammadzadeh confirmed the rumors by publishing a post on Instagram. The couple married in July 2021.

Filmography

Film

Web

Music video

Theatre 
Violence against women
My cinemas
The little prince
Small black fish
I Am an Emotional Creature: The Secret Life of Girls Around the World
A Memory, a Monologue, a Rant, and a Prayer
I'm a salvador

Awards and nominations

References

External links

 

1997 births
Living people
People from Tehran
Actresses from Tehran
Afghan film actresses
Iranian film actresses
Iranian stage actresses
Iranian television actresses
21st-century Iranian actresses
Iranian people of Afghan descent